The action of 28 June 1803 marked the opening shots of the Blockade of Saint-Domingue after the collapse of the Treaty of Amiens and the outbreak of the War of the Third Coalition in May 1803.

A French heavy frigate and a corvette, both partially armed en flûte and unaware of the recently begun war, met three British 74-gun ships of the line. The corvette was overhauled and captured, but the frigate, sailing close to shore, managed to out-manoeuver her opponent and deliver a devastating raking broadside that put her out of action.

The feat of a frigate managing to escape a ship of the line yielded high praise for Willaumez, who had commanded the frigate. A large painting by Louis-Philippe Crépin was commissioned in 1819 to commemorate the event.

Background
France had been in peace with Great Britain since the Treaty of Amiens in 1801, allowing her to consolidate her grasp on her colonies overseas. This was particularly sensitive in Saint-Domingue, where the Haitian Revolution had raged since 1791. First Consul Bonaparte ordered the Saint-Domingue expedition, under General Leclerc, to curtail the separatist tendencies of General Toussaint Louverture. Meanwhile, the Treaty of Amiens proved to be an unsuitable settlement of Franco-British differences; its application by both parties became erratic and tensions grew. In May 1803, Britain declared war on France, setting the War of the Third Coalition into motion. In late June, this news had yet to reach the French station of Saint-Domingue. On 27 June 1803, the 40-gun frigate Poursuivante, under Willaumez, departed Les Cayes, bound for Cap-Haïtien, in the company of the 16-gun corvette Mignonne, under Commander Jean-Pierre Bargeau.

Neither of the ships was fully armed or manned: Poursuivante, pierced to mount twenty-four 24-pounder long guns on her battery and sixteen 8-pounders on her castles, carried only 22 and 12 respectively and, more critically, had only 25 shots for each gun and a crew of only 150 men; Mignonne, nominally carrying sixteen 18-pounder long guns, was equipped only with twelve 12-pounders and an 80-man complement. A 50-ship British convoy was sailing off Môle-Saint-Nicolas under escort of three 74-gun ships of the line: they were the 74-gun HMS Hercule, Cumberland and Goliath, under Captain Henry William Bayntun, Captain Charles Brisbane and acting captain John B. Hills respectively. In the early morning of 28 June 1803, the two formations came in view of one another.

Battle

Spotting two strange sails in-shore, the British escort detached to investigate and Willaumez soon identified the three 74s as British. Unaware of the outbreak of the war but suspicious of the intentions of the British, Willaumez prepared a defence in case of attack. At eight, the 74-gun HMS Hercule came in range; after signaling the other ships in her division, she hoisted the British flag, prompting Poursuivante to hoist the French colours. Meanwhile, Goliath chased Mignonne and taking advantage of the sea wind whereas the corvette was becalmed, quickly overhauled her; after a few token shots, Mignonne struck her colours to her overwhelming opponent.

At nine, Hercule fired a ball shot at Poursuivante, initiating the battle. As Hercule closed to the shore to engage, she had less and less water under her keel and came into lighter and erratic winds; although these advantaged the shallower and more maneuverable frigate, Poursuivante lacked the ammunition to energetically answer Hercules fire,  and her diminished crew could not simultaneously man her batteries and handle her sails. On the other hand, because she had to ration her fire, Poursuivante aimed careful shots that soon caused significant damage to Hercules rigging.

After two hours of mutual cannonade, at eleven, the wind fell and both ships almost came to a sudden halt, their main sailing resource now the gusts of wind from the shore. Taking advantage of this change in the weather, Willaumez ordered his gunners to cease fire and help manoeuver his frigate, quickly coming in position to rake Hercule, only then firing a devastating broadside at her stern.  The damage and confusion on Hercule were such that, probably fearing to run aground, she effectively dropped out of action.  This allowed Poursuivante to reach the safety of Môle-Saint-Nicolas, cheered by the crowd and saluted by the artillery of the forts.

Aftermath 

Hercules rigging had suffered considerably, but she only had a few wounded. Hills was forced to retire with his ship to Jamaica for repairs;  replaced Hercule in Bayntun's squadron. Though Mignonne served briefly in the Royal Navy, there is no record of her actually being commissioned; she grounded and was condemned in 1804. Poursuivante had ten men killed and fifteen wounded, her hull had sustained several shots and her rigging was much damaged. As Cap-Haïtien lacked the resources to repair the frigate, Willaumez had to sail her back to France.

After Willaumez departed and sailed around the south of Cuba, a violent gust of wind dismasted Poursuivante, forcing Willaumez to make a port call in Baltimore to repair his frigate. When ready, he departed the Chesapeake, avoided the British blockade and crossed the Atlantic, reaching Rochefort on 28 May 1804. There, he was intercepted by a British ship of the line, which he battled for 30 minutes before breaking off and finding shelter at Île-d'Aix. Poursuivante hardly sailed again, and became a hulk in June 1806. Willaumez had been made a Knight in the Order of the Legion of Honour in February. He was promoted to Officer in June, and congratulated by Navy minister Decrès. A large painting by Louis-Philippe Crépin was commissioned in 1819 to commemorate the event; it long decorated the office of the Minister of the Navy, and is now in display at the Musée national de la Marine in Paris.

Notes

References

Bibliography 
 
 
 
 
 

1803 in France
Conflicts in 1803
June 1803 events
Military history of Haiti
Naval battles involving France
Naval battles involving the United Kingdom
Naval battles of the French Revolutionary Wars
Wars involving Haiti